Selective recruitment is an observed effect in traffic safety.  When safety belt laws are passed, belt wearing rates increase, but casualties decline by smaller percentages than estimated in a simple calculation.  This is because those converted from non-use to use are not “recruited” random members of the driving population.  Instead, users differ from non-users in many ways that influence safety.  Two effects are:

1.	When non-wearers crash, they have more severe crashes.
2.	Non-wearers are more likely to crash

Illustrative example of effect
Say initial belt use was zero (it never is, but this assumption makes it easy to understand), and after a belt law is passed use rate increases to 50%.  As belts reduce driver fatality risk in crashes by 42%, a naive calculation would lead one to expect a 21% reduction in fatalities.  In fact, a lesser reduction is observed.  A somewhat complicated equation (p. 293 of Traffic Safety (book) estimates expected fatality reductions when use rates increase from any initial percent to any new percent.  For the case of an increase in belt use from zero to 50%, the calculated reduction in deaths is 16%, well below the 21% estimated from the naive calculation.

Diminishes effectiveness of belt wearing laws
So even when belt wearing rates reach 90%, the 10% who do not wear have substantially more crashes, and more severe crashes, than the overall population.  The 10% of non wearers thus make a far larger contribution to the overall casualty toll than might appear likely if selective recruitment did not occur.

Hardly unexpected
Belt wearers have been shown in more than a dozen good studies to behave differently from non-wearers.  The phenomenon is in many ways obvious and to be expected.  When a belt-wearing law is in effect, those not wearing belts are violating traffic law.  Someone who does not obey one traffic law is more likely to not obey another – hence those who do not use belts are more likely to speed, drive drunk, and so on.

Although selective recruitment provides a perfectly reasonable and quantitative explanation for why casualty reductions from belt laws fall short of those computed simply from increased belt use, other explanations that are convincingly refuted by mountains of research persist.

The risk compensation explanation claims that the same driver substantially increases risk taking as a consequence of being compelled to wear a belt.  Any such interpretation  is compelling rejected by simple analyses of innumerable data sets (fatalities, crash-involvement rates, insurance claims).  Any behavior change can change the risk of a fatal crash by no more than 5% percent in either direction—dramatically less than the 42% reduction in fatality risk provided by the belt in a crash.  Claims that substantially lower than expected safety benefits from belts are due to drivers changing their behavior as a result of being compelled to wear belts are well outside the solid body of accepted traffic safety knowledge.

Sampling (statistics)
Automotive safety